Victor Emmanuel II (full name: Vittorio Emanuele Maria Alberto Eugenio Ferdinando Tommaso di Savoia; 14 March 1820 – 9 January 1878) was King of Sardinia from 1849 until 17 March 1861, when he assumed the title of King of Italy and became the first king of an independent, united Italy since the 6th century, a title he held until his death in 1878. Borrowing from the old Latin title Pater Patriae of the Roman emperors, the Italians gave him the epithet of Father of the Fatherland.

Born in Turin as the eldest son of Charles Albert, Prince of Carignano, and Maria Theresa of Austria, he fought in the First Italian War of Independence (1848–1849) before being made King of Piedmont-Sardinia following his father's abdication. He appointed Camillo Benso, Count of Cavour, as his Prime Minister, and he consolidated his position by suppressing the republican left. In 1855, he sent an expeditionary corps to side with French and British forces during the Crimean War; the deployment of Italian troops to the Crimea, and the gallantry shown by them in the Battle of the Chernaya (16 August 1855) and in the siege of Sevastopol led the Kingdom of Sardinia to be among the participants at the peace conference at the end of the war, where it could address the issue of the Italian unification to other European powers. This allowed Victor Emmanuel to ally himself with Napoleon III, Emperor of France. France had supported Sardinia in the Second Italian War of Independence, resulting in liberating Lombardy from Austrian rule.

Victor Emmanuel supported the Expedition of the Thousand (1860–1861) led by Giuseppe Garibaldi, which resulted in the rapid fall of the Kingdom of the Two Sicilies in southern Italy. However, Victor Emmanuel halted Garibaldi when he appeared ready to attack Rome, still under the Papal States, as it was under French protection. In 1860, Tuscany, Modena, Parma and Romagna decided to side with Sardinia-Piedmont, and Victor Emmanuel then marched victoriously in the Marche and Umbria after the victorious Battle of Castelfidardo over the Papal forces. This led to his excommunication from the Catholic Church until 1878, just before his death in the same year. He subsequently met Garibaldi at Teano, receiving from him the control of southern Italy and becoming the first King of Italy on 17 March 1861.

In 1866, the Third Italian War of Independence allowed Italy to annex Veneto. In 1870, Victor Emmanuel also took advantage of the Prussian victory over France in the Franco-Prussian War to conquer the Papal States after the French withdrew. He entered Rome on 20 September 1870 and set up the new capital there on 2 July 1871. He died in Rome in 1878, and was buried in the Pantheon.

The Italian national Victor Emmanuel II monument in Rome, containing the Altare della Patria, was built in his honor.

Biography

Victor Emmanuel was born as the eldest son of Carlo Alberto Prince of Carignano, and Maria Theresa of Austria. His father succeeded a distant cousin as King of Sardinia-Piedmont in 1831. He lived for some years of his youth in Florence and showed an early interest in politics, the military, and sports. In 1842, he married his cousin, Adelaide of Austria. He was styled as the Duke of Savoy prior to becoming King of Sardinia-Piedmont.

He took part in the First Italian War of Independence (1848–1849) under his father, King Charles Albert, fighting in the front line at the battles of Pastrengo, Santa Lucia, Goito and Custoza.

He became King of Sardinia-Piedmont in 1849 when his father abdicated the throne, after being defeated by the Austrians at the Battle of Novara. Victor Emmanuel was immediately able to obtain a rather favorable armistice at Vignale by the Austrian imperial army commander, Radetzky. The treaty, however, was not ratified by the Piedmontese lower parliamentary house, the Chamber of Deputies, and Victor Emmanuel retaliated by firing his Prime Minister, Claudio Gabriele de Launay, replacing him with Massimo D'Azeglio. After new elections, the peace with Austria was accepted by the new Chamber of Deputies. In 1849, Victor Emmanuel also fiercely suppressed a revolt in Genoa, defining the rebels as a "vile and infected race of canailles."

In 1852, he appointed Count Camillo Benso of Cavour ("Count Cavour") as Prime Minister of Piedmont-Sardinia. This turned out to be a wise choice, since Cavour was a political mastermind and a major player in the Italian unification in his own right. Victor Emmanuel II soon became the symbol of the "Risorgimento", the Italian unification movement of the 1850s and early 60s.  He was especially popular in the Kingdom of Sardinia-Piedmont because of his respect for the new constitution and his liberal reforms.

Crimean War

Following Victor Emmanuel's advice, Cavour joined Britain and France in the Crimean War against Russia. Cavour was reluctant to go to war due to the power of Russia at the time and the expense of doing so. Victor Emmanuel, however, was convinced of the rewards to be gained from the alliance created with Britain and, more importantly, France.

After successfully seeking British support and ingratiating himself with France and Napoleon III at the Congress of Paris in 1856 at the end of the war, Count Cavour arranged a secret meeting with the French emperor. In 1858, they met at Plombières-les-Bains (in Lorraine), where they agreed that if the French were to help Piedmont combat Austria, which still reigned over the Kingdom of Lombardy–Venetia in northern Italy, France would be awarded Nice and Savoy.

Wars of Italian Unification

The Italo-French campaign against Austria in 1859 started successfully. However, sickened by the casualties of the war and worried about the mobilisation of Prussian troops, Napoleon III secretly made a treaty with Franz Joseph of Austria at Villafranca whereby Piedmont would only gain Lombardy. France did not as a result receive the promised Nice and Savoy, but Austria did keep Venetia, a major setback for the Piedmontese, in no small part because the treaty had been prepared without their knowledge. After several quarrels about the outcome of the war, Cavour resigned, and the king had to find other advisors. France indeed only gained Nice and Savoy after the Treaty of Turin was signed in March 1860, after Cavour had been reinstalled as Prime Minister, and a deal with the French was struck for plebiscites to take place in the Central Italian Duchies.

Later that same year, Victor Emmanuel II sent his forces to fight the papal army at Castelfidardo and drove the Pope into Vatican City. His success at these goals led him to be excommunicated from the Catholic Church until 1878, when it was lifted just before his death. Then, Giuseppe Garibaldi conquered Sicily and Naples, and Sardinia-Piedmont grew even larger. On 17 March 1861 the Kingdom of Italy was officially established and Victor Emmanuel II became its king.

Victor Emmanuel supported Giuseppe Garibaldi's Expedition of the Thousand (1860–1861), which resulted in the rapid fall of the Kingdom of the Two Sicilies in southern Italy. However, the king halted Garibaldi when he appeared ready to attack Rome, still under the Papal States, as it was under French protection. In 1860, through local plebiscites, Tuscany, Modena, Parma and Romagna decided to side with Sardinia-Piedmont. Victor Emmanuel then marched victoriously in the Marche and Umbria after the victorious battle of Castelfidardo (1860) over the Papal forces.

The king subsequently met with Garibaldi at Teano, receiving from him the control of southern Italy. Another series of plebiscites in the occupied lands resulted in the proclamation of Victor Emmanuel as the first King of Italy by the new Parliament of unified Italy, on 17 March 1861. He did not renumber himself after assuming the new royal title, however. Turin became the capital of the new state. Only Rome, Veneto, and Trentino remained to be conquered.

Completion of the unification

In 1866 Victor Emmanuel allied himself with Prussia in the Third Italian War of Independence. Although not victorious in the Italian theater, he managed anyway to receive Veneto after the Austrian defeat in Germany. The British Foreign Secretary, Lord Clarendon, visited Florence in December 1867 and reported to London after talking to various Italian politicians: "There is universal agreement that Victor Emmanuel is an imbecile; he is a dishonest man who tells lies to everyone; at this rate he will end up losing his crown and ruining both Italy and his dynasty." In 1870, after two failed attempts by Garibaldi, he also took advantage of the Prussian victory over France in the Franco-Prussian War to capture Rome after the French withdrew. He entered Rome on 20 September 1870 and set up the new capital there on 2 July 1871, after a temporary move to Florence in 1864. The new Royal residence was the Quirinal Palace.

The rest of Victor Emmanuel II's reign was much quieter. After the Kingdom of Italy was established he decided to continue on as King Victor Emmanuel II instead of Victor Emmanuel I of Italy. This was a terrible move as far as public relations went as it was not indicative of the fresh start that the Italian people wanted and suggested that Sardinia-Piedmont had taken over the Italian Peninsula, rather than unifying it. Despite this mishap, the remainder of Victor Emmanuel II's reign was consumed by wrapping up loose ends and dealing with economic and cultural issues. His role in day-to-day governing gradually dwindled, as it became increasingly apparent that a king could no longer keep a government in office against the will of Parliament. As a result, while the wording of the Statuto Albertino stipulating that ministers were solely responsible to the crown remained unchanged, in practice they were now responsible to Parliament.

Victor Emmanuel died in Rome in 1878, after meeting with the envoys of Pope Pius IX, who had reversed the excommunication, and received last rites. He was buried in the Pantheon. His successor was his son Umberto I.

Family and children
In 1842 he married his paternal aunt's daughter Adelaide of Austria (1822–1855). With her, he had eight children:
 Maria Clotilde (1843–1911), who married Napoléon Joseph (the Prince Napoléon). Their grandson Prince Louis Napoléon was the Bonapartist pretender to the French imperial throne.

 Umberto (1844–1900), later King of Italy. He married his first cousin Margherita of Savoy.
 Amadeo (1845–1890), later King of Spain. He married Maria Vittoria dal Pozzo and later Maria Letizia Bonaparte.
 Oddone Eugenio Maria (1846–1866), Duke of Montferrat.
 Maria Pia (1847–1911), who married King Louis of Portugal.
 Carlo Alberto (2 June 1851 – 28 June 1854), Duke of Chablais.
 Vittorio Emanuele (6 July 1852 – 6 July 1852).
 Vittorio Emanuele (18 January 1855 – 17 May 1855), Count of Geneva.

In 1869 he married morganatically his principal mistress Rosa Vercellana (3 June 1833 – 26 December 1885). Popularly known in Piedmontese as "Bela Rosin", she was born a commoner but made Countess of Mirafiori and Fontanafredda in 1858. Their offspring were:
 Vittoria Guerrieri (2 December 1848 – 29 December 1905), married three times: to Giacomo Spinola, Luigi Spinola and Paolo DeSimone. She had issue.
 Emanuele Alberto Guerrieri (16 March 1851 – 24 December 1894), Count of Mirafiori and Fontanafredda, married and had issue.

In addition to his morganatic second wife, Victor Emmanuel II had several other mistresses:

1) Laura Bon at Stupinigi, who bore him one daughter:
 Maria Emanuela Alberta Vittoria Guerrieri di Roverbella (6 September 1853 – 1890) married to Vincenzo Pietraforte.

2) Baroness Vittoria Duplesis who bore him another daughter:
 Savoiarda of Savoy (1856–1885).

3) Unknown mistress at Mondovì,
mother of:
 Donato Etna (1858–1938) who became a soldier during the First World War.

4) Virginia Rho at Turin, mother of two children:
 Vittorio di Rho (1861 – Turin, 10 October 1913). He became a notable photographer.
 Maria Pia di Rho (25 February 1866 – Vienna, 19 April 1947). Married to count Alessandro Montecuccoli.

5) Rosalinda Incoronata De Domenicis (1846–1916), mother of one daughter:
 Vittoria De Domenicis (1869–1935) who married doctor Alberto Benedetti (1870–1920), with issue.

6) Angela Rosa De Filippo, mother of:
 Actor Domenico Scarpetta (1876–1952)

Honours and arms

Italian
 Knight of the Order of the Annunciation, 23 December 1836; Grand Master, 23 March 1849
 Grand Cross of the Order of Saints Maurice and Lazarus, 1836; Grand Master, 23 March 1849
 Grand Master of the Military Order of Savoy
 Grand Master of the Order of the Crown of Italy
 Grand Master of the Civil Order of Savoy
 Gold Medal of Military Valour
 Silver Medal of Military Valour
 Medal of the Liberation of Rome (1849–1870)
 Commemorative Medal of Campaigns of Independence Wars
 Commemorative Medal of the Unity of Italy
  Tuscan Grand Ducal family: Grand Cross of the Order of St. Joseph

Foreign
 :
 Knight of the Order of the Golden Fleece, 1841
 Grand Cross of the Order of St. Stephen, 1869
 :
 Knight of the House Order of Fidelity, 1864
 Grand Cross of the Order of the Zähringer Lion, 1864
 : Knight of the Order of St. Hubert, 1869
 : Grand Cordon of the Order of Leopold, 25 July 1855
 : Knight of the Order of the Elephant, 2 September 1861
  French Empire:
 Médaille militaire
 Commemorative medal of the 1859 Italian Campaign
 : Grand Cross of the Order of Kamehameha I, 1865
  Mexican Empire: Grand Cross of the Order of the Mexican Eagle, with Collar, 1865
  Kingdom of Prussia:
 Knight of the Order of the Black Eagle, 12 January 1866; with Collar, 1875
 Pour le Mérite (military), 29 May 1872
 : Knight of the Order of the Rue Crown, 1850
   Sweden-Norway: Knight of the Order of the Seraphim, 30 August 1861
  Beylik of Tunis: Husainid Family Order
 : Stranger Knight of the Order of the Garter, 5 December 1855

Arms

Ancestry

See also
 Unification of Italy
 Giuseppe Garibaldi
 Count Cavour
 Monument to Vittorio Emanuele II
 Rome
 Kingdom of Italy
 Italian Islands of the Aegean
 Italian Libya
 Italian East Africa
 Italian Ethiopia 
 Emperor of Ethiopia
 Governor-General and Viceroy of Italian East Africa - Viceroy of Italian East Africa

Notes

References

Sources
 
 
  old interpretations but useful on details; vol 1 goes to 1859]; volume 2 online covers 1859–62

In Italian

External links

 
 External link: Genealogy of recent members of the House of Savoy
 View of Venezia Square Victor Emmanuel II monument (archived 1 July 2006)

 
1820 births
1878 deaths
19th-century kings of Italy
19th-century kings of Sardinia
Nobility from Turin
Grand Masters of the Gold Medal of Military Valor
Italian monarchs
Kings of Italy (1861–1946)
Princes of Savoy
Italian people of the Italian unification
Italian people of Polish descent
Italian generals
Claimant Kings of Jerusalem
Princes of Savoy-Carignan
Modern history of Italy
People of the Revolutions of 1848
Roman Catholic monarchs
People temporarily excommunicated by the Catholic Church
Burials at the Pantheon, Rome
Knights Grand Cross of the Order of Saints Maurice and Lazarus
Extra Knights Companion of the Garter
Knights of the Golden Fleece of Austria
Grand Crosses of the Order of Saint Stephen of Hungary
Recipients of the Pour le Mérite (military class)